Georges Dubois (born 19 May 1935) is a Swiss cross-country skier. He competed in the men's 30 kilometre event at the 1964 Winter Olympics.

References

External links
 

1935 births
Living people
Swiss male cross-country skiers
Olympic cross-country skiers of Switzerland
Cross-country skiers at the 1964 Winter Olympics
People from La Chaux-de-Fonds
Sportspeople from the canton of Neuchâtel